The Polish Academy Special Awards was an annual special award given since 2001 to 2003, as part of the Polish Film Awards.

Winners
 2001: Roman Polanski, Stanisław Pacuk
 2002: Agnieszka Holland, Sławomir Idziak
 2003: Jeremy Thomas, Jerzy Skolimowski

External links
 Polish Film Awards; Official website 

Polish film awards
Awards established in 2001
Awards disestablished in 2003